Van Chu-Lin  (1893–1946) was a notable New Zealand homemaker and storekeeper. She was born in Canton, China in about 1893.

References

1893 births
1946 deaths
New Zealand traders
Chinese emigrants to New Zealand